This is a list of archdeacons of Carmarthen. The Archdeacon of Carmarthen is the priest in charge of the archdeaconry of Carmarthen, an administrative division of the Church in Wales Diocese of St David's. The archdeaconry comprises the five deaneries of Carmarthen, Cydweli, Dyffryn Aman, Llangadog/Llandeilo and St Clears.

List of Archdeacons of Carmarthen
 ?1115, ?1121 William
 1328, 1330 Walter Winter 
 1355 Gruffudd Caunton
 1356–? Hywel Fychan
 1357–? David Martin of Rosemarket
 1359–? John Clyewe
 1368 William Baldwin
 1383, 1389 William Nicholls
 1386 John David
 1391 Edmund Warham
 ?–1404 John Walton
 1404–? Adam de Usk
 1408–? William Chichele
 1412–? William Newport
 1432, 1439 William Pirrye
 ?–1488 Richard Keyr
 1488–1494 John Morgan or Young (afterwards Bishop of St David's, 1496)
 1494-1509 Henry ap Hywel
 1509–? Edward ap John
 1535 Gruffudd Leyshon
 c.1543–? John Barlow
 1549–1553? George Constantine
 1554–1583 Gruffudd Leyshon
 1583–? Meredith Morgan
 1616–>1640 William Beeley
 William Beale
 1643–? Henry Mellin
 1660–1677 William Jones
 1677–1708 Thomas Stanoe
 1708–1727 Edward Tenison (afterwards Bishop of Ossory, 1730)
 1727–1742 Thomas Tenison (son of above)
 1742–1767  Rhys, Rice (or Price) Williams
 1767–1768 Charles Moss
 1768–1789 George Holcombe
 1789–?1793 William Probyn
 1793–?1827 William Crawford (died 1827)
 1827–1829 Benjamin Millingchamp
 1829–1832 Henry Thomas Payne
 1832–1858 Richard Venables
 1858-1865 John Evans (deceased)
 1865–1879 David Archard Williams
 1879–1896 William James (died 1896)
 1896–1899 Shadrach Pryce (afterwards Dean of St Asaph, 1899)
 1899-1901 David Lewis (died 1901)
 1901-1914 Owen Evans
 1914–?1938 Robert Williams (died 1938)
 1938–1949 David Jones
 1950–1960 John Pugh
 1960–1967 Ungoed Jacob (afterwards Dean of Brecon, 1967)
 1967–1974 Owen Jenkins
 1974–1982 Thomas Evans
 1982–1985 Roy Davies (afterwards Bishop of Llandaff, 1985) 
 1985–1991 Bertram Hughes
 ?1991–1993 Kerry Goulstone (afterwards Dean of St Asaph, 1993)
 1993–1999 Islwyn John
 1999–2004 Anthony Crockett (afterwards Bishop of Bangor, 2004)
 2004–2012 Alun Wyn Evans
 2012–2017 Roger Hughes
 12 November 2017present Dorrien Davies

Sources

Hardy, Thomas Duffus, ed. (1854), Fasti Ecclesiae Anglicanae 1066–1854, 1, p. 313

References

Carmarthen